Habrosyne dieckmanni is a moth in the family Drepanidae. It is found in the Russian Far East, Japan, north-eastern China (Heilongjiang, Jilin) and Korea.

The larvae feed on Rubus species.

References

Thyatirinae
Moths described in 1888